NGC 246 (also known as the Skull Nebula or Caldwell 56) is a planetary nebula in the constellation Cetus. It is the first known planetary nebula to have a hierarchical triple star system at its center. The nebula and the stars associated with it are listed in several catalogs, as summarized by the SIMBAD database. NGC 246 was discovered by William Herschel in 1785.

The nebula is roughly 1,600 light-years away. NGC 246's central star is the 12th magnitude white dwarf HIP 3678 A.

NGC 246 is not to be confused with the Rosette Nebula (NGC 2337), which is also referred to as the "Skull." Among some amateur astronomers, NGC 246 is known as the "Pac-Man Nebula" because of the arrangement of its central stars and the surrounding star field.

Discovery and research 
In 1785, William Herschel discovered NGC 246.

In 2014, astronomers discovered a second companion to NGC 246's central star, HIP 3678 A, which has a comoving companion star called HIP 3678 B. The second companion star, a red dwarf known as HIP 3678 C, was discovered using the European Southern Observatory's Very Large Telescope.

Image gallery

References

External links
 

Planetary nebulae
Cetus (constellation)
0246
056b
17841127